Rahul Kumar (25 March 1985 – 20 May 2021) was an Indian professional footballer who played as a defender. He began his career with upstart club Pune in 2007 before moving to Kolkata and signing with Mohun Bagan. He spent one season with Mohun Bagan before signing with city rivals Chirag United. The next year, he moved to Goa and signed with Salgaocar before ending his career with Churchill Brothers.

Career
Born in Chandigarh, Kumar began his career playing in school tournaments before representing Punjab in the Santosh Trophy in 2005. His performance during the Santosh Trophy led to him signing with new I-League 2nd Division club Pune prior to their inaugural 2008 season. He made his debut for the club in their debut match on 26 March 2008 against Hindustan Aeronautics Limited, starting in the 2–1 victory.

In April 2009, Kumar was part of the Pune side which earned promotion to the I-League, the top flight of Indian football, following the 2009 season. After one season in the I-League with Pune, Kumar signed with Kolkata club Mohun Bagan prior to the start of the 2010–11 season. Following the season though, Kumar left and joined Chirag United. He spent a season with club before moving to Salgaocar.

Later in his career, Kumar signed with Southern Samity and Churchill Brothers. He retired in 2016 due to a physical illness.

Death
On 20 May 2021, Kumar died at the age of 36. Reports indicated that Kumar had been suffering from liver cancer and had recently contracted COVID-19.

References

1985 births
2021 deaths
Deaths from cancer in India
Indian footballers
Association football defenders
Punjab footballers
Pune FC players
Mohun Bagan AC players
United SC players
Salgaocar FC players
Southern Samity players
Churchill Brothers FC Goa players
Santosh Trophy players
I-League 2nd Division players
I-League players
Footballers from Chandigarh
Deaths from liver cancer